Geffner is a surname. Notable people with the surname include:

 Deborah Geffner (born 1952), American actress, singer, and dancer
 Glenn Geffner, American radio announcer
 Ron S. Geffner, American attorney